Deep Murder is a 2018 American horror comedy film, directed by Nick Corirossi, from a screenplay by Quinn Beswick, Josh Margolin, Benjamin Smolen and Nikolai von Keller. It stars Beswick, Katie Aselton, Christopher McDonald, Jerry O'Connell, Jessica Parker Kennedy, Chris Redd, Stephanie Drake and Margolin.

It had its world premiere at the Los Angeles Film Festival on September 21, 2018. It released on June 14, 2019, by Screen Media Films.

Cast
 Quinn Beswick as Hugh Dangler
 Katie Aselton as Babs Dangler
 Christopher McDonald as Richard Dangler
 Jerry O'Connell as Doug Dangler
 Jessica Parker Kennedy as Phyllis "Babysitter" Gorman
 Chris Redd as Jace Jizz
 Stephanie Drake as Dr. Bunny Van Clit
 Josh Margolin as Detective Brock Cross
 Nikki Benz as Sexy Plummer
 Neel Nanda as Pizza Boy
 Mickey Hooch Jr. as Hot Cop
 Isaac C. Singleton Jr. as Sexy Fireman

Production
In June 2017, it was announced Christopher McDonald, Johnny Simmons, Katie Aselton, Stephanie Drake, Jessica Parker Kennedy and Chris Redd had joined the cast of the film, with Nick Corirossi directing from a screenplay by Quinn Beswick, Josh Margolin, Benjamin Smolen, and Nikolai von Keller. Eric B. Fleischman, Andrew Swett, Drew Foster, Jesse Berger, Pat McErlean and Brent C. Johnson will serve as producers on the film.

Release
The film had its world premiere at the Los Angeles Film Festival on September 21, 2018. Shortly after, Screen Media Films acquired distribution rights to the film. It released on June 14, 2019.

References

External links

2018 films
American comedy horror films
American independent films
2018 comedy horror films
2010s English-language films
2010s American films